Wayne Linton (born 21 October 1955) is  a former Australian rules footballer who played with Fitzroy in the Victorian Football League (VFL). 

Children: Ben Linton, Bianca Linton and James Linton.

Notes

External links 		
		
		
		
		
		
		
Living people		
1955 births		
		
Australian rules footballers from Victoria (Australia)		
Fitzroy Football Club players
Camperdown Football Club players